Hullumeelsus is a 1968 Estonian drama film directed by Kaljo Kiisk.

Awards, nominations, participations:
 1969: Baltic Soviet Republics and Byelorussian Film Festival (USSR), best male actor: Jüri Järvet
 1984: San Remo Film Festival (Italy), participation

Plot

Cast

 Jüri Järvet - Windisch
  - human nr 1
 Valeri Nosik - editor

References

External links
 
 Hullumeelsus, entry in Estonian Film Database (EFIS)

1968 films
Estonian drama films
Estonian-language films